Pemra Özgen and Despina Papamichail were the defending champions, but chose not to participate.

Amina Anshba and Anastasia Dețiuc won the title, defeating Ankita Raina and Bibiane Schoofs in the final, 0–6, 6–3, [10–8].

Seeds

Draw

Draw

References
Main Draw

Reinert Open - Doubles
Reinert Open